Krakiai (Samogitian: Krakē), a village on Venta River in Northeastern Lithuania, Mažeikiai district municipality. It is 6 km to the southeast of Mažeikiai. According to the 2011 census, the town has a population of 621 people. In historical documents Krakiai was first mentioned in 1661.

External links
  Resourceful site

References

Villages in Telšiai County
Mažeikiai District Municipality